Vijayalakshmi Art Pictures  (Telugu:విజయలక్ష్మీ ఆర్ట్ పిక్చర్స్ ) was an Indian film production company, owned by producer T. Trivikrama Rao.

Film production

References

Film production companies based in Hyderabad, India
Year of establishment missing